Stanley Pittman (September 14, 1920 - November 10, 1999) served in the California State Senate for the 6th district from 1963 to 1967, following service on the Oroville City Council and the Butte County Board of Supervisors. During World War II, he also served in the United States Navy.

References

United States Navy personnel of World War II
1920 births
1999 deaths
Politicians from Oroville, California
20th-century American politicians
Republican Party California state senators